Acer barbinerve, commonly known as bearded maple, is an Asian species of maple found in Korea, eastern Russia, and northeastern China (Heilongjiang, Jilin, Liaoning).

Acer barbinerve may grow as a shrub or a multi-stemmed tree up to 7 meters tall. It has smooth gray bark; the leaves are non-compound, with 5 shallow lobes, the blade up to 10 cm long, with teeth along the edges. It is a dioecious species, with separate male and female plants.

References

External links
line drawings for Flora of China, figure 587, drawings 1 + 2  at top

barbinerve
Plants described in 1867
Flora of Russia
Flora of Korea
Trees of China
Dioecious plants